Arthur F. Sampson (October 8, 1926 – March 13, 1988) was an American administrator who served as Administrator of the General Services Administration from 1972 to 1975.

He died of cardiac arrest on March 13, 1988, in Rockville, Maryland at age 61.

References

1926 births
1988 deaths
Administrators of the General Services Administration
Nixon administration personnel
Ford administration personnel